The Coma is a novel by Alex Garland, illustrated by his father, Nicholas Garland. It explores the boundary between the conscious and subconscious mind. The Coma was published in 2004, eight years after Garland's first novel, The Beach.

Plot summary
While traveling home on an underground train, Carl is forced to defend a young girl from the harassment of a group of men. For his efforts, Carl is violently attacked and falls into a coma. When he awakes, he quickly discovers that his seemingly normal world is very peculiar.

Critical reception
Scott Tobias, writing for the A.V. Club, said, "The Coma lacks the gravity of ideas, which leaves the narrative to drift along in the blinkered consciousness of a pot haze."

Tim Adams, writing for the Guardian, said, "Garland is very good at recreating the virtual worlds of the half-awake and then subtly dissolving them."

A reviewer for Bookslut said, "Initially, some of Garland’s motifs and literary devices seemed too elaborate and obscure; yet on a second read they disentangle and shine."

Scott Lamb, writing for Salon, said, “The Coma is essentially a story composed of a single arc, and this formal tic may, for some, be its big weakness ... What the book lacks in plot twists, though, it makes up for in atmosphere and tone."

Adaptations
In 2006, The Coma was adapted into a play by a writer called Marcus Condron, and then was performed by a theatre group called 'We Could Be Kings'. The play made heavy use of projected video content to help express the thoughts of Carl, and original music was composed for the piece by Alex Cornish.

References

See also

 Simulated reality

2004 British novels
English novels
Novels by Alex Garland
Faber and Faber books